This is a list of bottle types, brands and companies. A bottle is a rigid container with a neck that is narrower than the body, and a "mouth". Bottles are often made of glass, clay, plastic, aluminum or other impervious materials, and are typically used to store liquids. The bottle has developed over millennia of use, with some of the earliest examples appearing in China, Phoenicia, Rome and Crete. Bottles are often recycled according to the SPI recycling code for the material. Some regions have a container deposit which is refunded after returning the bottle to the retailer.

A
 Aluminum bottle

B

 Baby bottle
 Sippy cup
 Beer bottle
 Bottle conditioning
 De Nederlandse Bierfles (pijpje)
 Growler
 Types of beer bottles
 Bobble water bottle
 Bocksbeutel
 Borosilicate bottles
Boston round
 Bota bag
 Bottle garden
 Bottle trap for insects
 Bridge-spouted vessel

C

 Calabash also known as a bottle gourd
 Canteen
 Carboy
 Coca-Cola bottle
 Hiram Codd
 Codd-neck bottle
 Whitwick bottles

D

 Decanter
 Double spout and bridge vessel

E
 Early American molded glass
 Ekman water bottle

F
 Flacon

G

 Gas cylinder
 Bailout bottle
 Diving cylinder
 Lecture bottle
 Pony bottle
 Gasogene
 Glass bottle
 Bologna bottle
 Boston round
 Fiasco
 Glass (film)
 Glass onion
 Growler (jug)

H
 Hydro flask
 Hot water bottle

I

 Impossible bottle an example includes a ship in a bottle

J
 Jerrycan

K
 Keglon bottle
 Klein bottle
 Knox Glass Bottle Company

L

 Laboratory bottles
 Laboratory flask
 Reagent bottle
 Wash bottle
 Weighing bottle
 Lacrymatory
 LifeSaver bottle

M
 Magnetic bottles
 Maker's Mark bottle
 Mariotte's bottle
 Milk bottle
 Milk bottle top

N

 Nalgene bottle
 Nansen bottle
 National Bottle Museum located in Ballston Spa, New York

P
 Perfume bottle
 Plastic bottle
 Blowmolding machine
 Low plastic water bottle
 PET bottle recycling
 Prescription bottle
 Product Architects, Inc. produces Polar Bottle brand insulated sport water bottles and Half Twist lifestyle bottles

S

 Safe bottle lamp
 Sealed bottles
 Seltzer bottle also known as a soda syphon
 Shake bottle used in bottle pool
 SIGG
 Sipper water bottle
 Snuff bottle
 Soap bottle
 Spray bottle
 Squeeze bottle
 Stanley bottle
 Stirrup jar
 Stirrup spout vessel
 Moche Crawling Feline

T

 Thermos also referred to as a vacuum flask
 Thermos L.L.C.
 American Thermos Bottle Company Laurel Hill Plant
 Tuned bottles
 Two-liter bottle

W
 Water bottle
 Reuse of water bottles
 Wine bottle
 Bottle variation
 Closure
 Porron
 Witch bottle

See also

 99 Bottles of Beer
 Amphora
 Anchor bottler
 Bag-in-box
 Barrel
 Benewah Milk Bottle
 Beverage can
 Bottle cap
 Bottle crate
 Bottle cutting
 Bottle dynamo
 Bottle flipping
 Bottle glorifier
 Bottle jack
 Bottle-kicking
 Bottle opener
 Bottle oven
 Bottle recycling
 Bottle rocket
 Bottle scraper
 Bottle service
 Bottle Tops
 Bottle tree
 Bottle wall
 Bottled in bond
 Bottled water
 Bottled water in the United States
 Bottling company
 List of bottling companies
 Bottling (concert abuse)
 Bottling line
 Bung
 Closure
 Container deposit legislation
 Container deposit legislation in the United States
 Oregon Bottle Bill
 Tennessee Bottle Bill
 Container glass
 Fizz keeper
 Glass production
 Independent bottler
 Jar
 Mason jar
 Keg
 List of glassware
 List of pen types, brands and companies
 Message in a bottle
 Muselet
 Pitcher
 Plastic rings on tops of bottles
 Reverse vending machine
 Ring-a-bottle
 Screw cap
 Alternative wine closure
 Screw cap
 Spin the bottle
 Storage of wine
 Vase
 Water rocket

Bottle landmarks

 The Bottle, Alabama
 Brooks Catsup Bottle Water Tower
 Grandma Prisbrey's Bottle Village
 Guaranteed Pure Milk bottle
 John J. Makinen Bottle House

References

bottle types
Packaging